Pedro Antonio Núñez Mejía (born September 5, 1989 in Hato Mayor del Rey) is a Dominican footballer who plays as a forward for CA Pantoja in the Liga Dominicana de Fútbol.

References

External links 
http://www.naciodigital.cat/latorredelpalau/mobil/amplia/20346
http://www.bdfutbol.com/en/j/j300634.html

1989 births
Living people
People from Hato Mayor del Rey
Dominican Republic footballers
Association football defenders
Dominican Republic international footballers
Segunda División B players
Tercera División players
Ligue Haïtienne players
Terrassa FC footballers
Divisiones Regionales de Fútbol players
Dominican Republic expatriate footballers
Dominican Republic expatriate sportspeople in Spain
Expatriate footballers in Spain
Dominican Republic expatriate sportspeople in Italy
Expatriate footballers in Italy
Expatriate footballers in Haiti
Tempête FC players
UE Rubí players